NBS Television is a Ugandan television network owned by Next Media Services. It is headquartered at Next Media Park, Plot 13, Summit View Road, Naguru, Kampala District.

Background 
The story of Next Media Services started with the founding of NBS Television with broadcasts commencing on June 16, 2008, when it was registered and got its license, owning just one transmitter and headquartered at Media Plaza in Kamwokya, a Kampala Suburb. The founding of the television heralded the launch of sister companies that include Sanyuka TV, Salaam TV (with broadcasting based on the Islamic faith), Nile post (an online newspaper), Next Radio, and Next Conference Centre ( an events center), Next Productions and Next Communications. The group celebrated its tenth anniversary in June 2018 and later moved to Next Media Park, the former headquarters of the now defunct WBS TV. NBS Television has several notable senior on-air personalities, including Joseph Kigozi; the current Chief of Strategy, Canary MugumeRukh-Shana Namuyimba, and Solomon Serwanjja as news presenters. One of the most celebrated female journalists in the East African region, Joy Doreen Biira, was a pioneer presenter.

The flagship station is known for its focus on politics, hence “The Political Command Centre” slogan. The station has one of the biggest political talk shows in the country, Frontline which airs every Thursday night and brings together political leaders from different political parties and Barometer, the Luganda equivalent which airs every Tuesday night.

NBS also has a series of business, movies, sports, youth and entertainment shows.

The group's Luganda television Sanyuka TV airs shows such as the Startimes Uganda Premier League and the popular showbiz program Uncut which also airs on NBS Television for  a short period.

Personalities

Canary Mugume 
Canary Mugume is a Ugandan investigative journalist with NBS Television and a Léo Africa Young Emerging Leaders Program Fellow. His investigative reporting is specialized in current affairs, dysfunctions of the economy, and social matters and led him to be elevated to the prime news bulletin Live @ 9 together with Isabella Tugume on Monday 2 August 2021.

Samson Kasumba 
Samson Kasumba is a Ugandan Pastor, News anchor and Show host. He works with NBS Television especially live at 9.

He was working with Urban TV Uganda before he joined NBS Television in 2016. He was also part of the Topowa Campaign by CCEDU, a human Rights advocate team sensitizing people during the 2016 general elections. He was of recent arrested for allegedly undermining government measures to curb the spread of COVID-19.

Solomon Serwanjja 
Solomon Serwanjja is a Ugandan investigative journalist and news anchor with NBS Television. In 2019, Serwanjja was awarded the Komla Dumor Award, an annual award presented by the BBC "to an outstanding individual living and working in Africa, who combines strong journalism skills, on-air flair, and an exceptional talent in telling African stories with the ambition and potential to become a star of the future."

Mildred Amooti Tuhaise 
Mildred Amooti Tuhaise is a Ugandan news anchor at NBS Television.

Rukh-Shana Namuyimba 
Rukh-Shana Namuyimba is a Ugandan communication specialist, News Anchor, and co-founder of Xfinity Communications, Ltd. She initially worked as a News Anchor at NTV Uganda before moving to NBS Television.

Dalton Kaweesa 
Dalton Kaweesa is an investigative journalist with a bias in security and conflict. He is a specialist in political and economical reporting and analysis. Before joining broadcast, he previously worked in print. His outstanding knowledge of political history and delivery has seen him grow through the newsroom ranks to become NBS's Chief News Editor. He previously served as Deputy News Editor in the same organization.

Former personalities 
Joy Doreen Biira, Morning Breeze
Tamale Mirundi on One on One political show

Notable programs 
 Kyaddala, 2019
 The Campus, 2016
NBS Live at 9
NBS Amasengejje
NBS After 5
NBS Frontline
NBS Barometer
Startimes Uganda Premier League (Sanyuka TV)
Uncut and Uncut Sabula (NBS Television & Sanyuka)

References

External links
 Top Ten NTV Presenters Who Left for NBS TV, Number 5 Is Shocking!
 NBS TV’s Kin Kariisa: How ‘cool’ barber became a media baron at Observer Uganda
 NBS TV preys NTV again and snatches sports presenter Andrew Kabuura at Buzz Nation 

Communications in Uganda
Mass media companies of Uganda
Companies based in Kampala